Ida Hedevig Moltke (1744–1816) was a Danish countess and letter writer.

Life
She was born to nobleman Frederik von Buchwald and Henriette Emilie von Holstein and became the cousin of Amalie Sofie Holstein and sister-in-law of Count Johann Hartwig Ernst von Bernstorff. In 1760, she married the courtier count Christian Frederik Moltke (1736–1771). 

The court office of her first spouse made her a participator in Danish court life, where she became known for her love life. While her spouse was the lover of Elisabet von Eyben, she had an affair with the Spanish envoy Sebastian de Llano y la Quadra. Although her spouse was on the queen's side against the king's favorite Conrad Holck, he lost his office in 1771 and the couple had to leave court. 

When Moltke died shortly after, a scandal occurred when his widow was accused of having caused his death by infecting him with a venereal disease, by having caused him to commit suicide out of sorrow because of her adultery, or by having been poisoned by her and her lover courtier nobleman Karl Adolf von Plessen. In 1771, she married Karl Adolf von Plessen shortly after she became a widow, which made them suspicious. They were never openly accused.

Karl Adolf von Plessen belonged to the circle of Schack Carl Rantzau–Ascheberg, who planned to make an alliance with Sweden against Russia, during which her spouse was to be sent as an agent to Sweden and Enevold Brandt to France. These plans were never realized.

Her preserved correspondence is generally regarded as a valuable historic source about the courtiers of the Danish royal court of her time.

See also
 Luise Gramm

References

Sources 
 August Fjelstrup: Damerne ved Karoline Mathildes Hof, 1909.

1744 births
1816 deaths
18th-century Danish people
18th-century Danish writers
18th-century Danish women writers
Danish letter writers
Women letter writers
Danish countesses